William Fiedler may refer to:

 Bill Fiedler (1910–1985), American soccer midfielder
 William H. F. Fiedler (1847–1919), U.S. Representative from  New Jersey